Rudy Ruiz is a writer, advocate, and social entrepreneur. Ruiz is known for writing The Resurrection of Fulgencio Ramirez and Valley of Shadows, magical realism novels which received critical acclaim and literary awards. In 2014, Ruiz authored Seven for the Revolution, a book that explores the "hard lives of Latinos and the fraught relations between their native and adoptive countries." The book won Best Popular Fiction–English and Best First Book in Fiction at the 2014 International Latino Book Awards. Ruiz is also a regular special contributor to CNN and co-founder of Interlex, an advertising and marketing agency whose work is focused on "public sector, non-profit, and socially conscientious marketing for multicultural audiences." Interlex is one of the 50 largest U.S. Hispanic advertising agencies, according to AdAge.

Early life
Rudy Ruiz was born in Brownsville, Texas, a bilingual and multicultural city along the border of Mexico. His parents, Rodolfo Ruiz and Lilia Zolezzi Ruiz, were Mexican immigrants. After graduating from St. Joseph Academy in 1986, Ruiz went on to Harvard University. He graduated from Harvard with a bachelor's degree in government and a master's degree in public policy from the John F. Kennedy School of Government. While at Harvard, Ruiz participated in Raza, Harvard's Chicano students organization. He was also part of Harvard's Undergraduate Council.

Career
In 1995, Ruiz co-founded Interlex with his wife Heather in San Antonio, Texas. Interlex is an advocacy and cause-related advertising and marketing firm that has worked with clients such as the Pan American Development Foundation, Tracfone Wireless’ SafeLink brand, American Express, Texas Department of Transportation, AARP, American Heart Association and Center for Science in the Public Interest. Interlex is one of the 50 largest U.S. Hispanic advertising agencies. Ruiz is the president and chief executive officer of the firm.

Interlex acquired Californian advertising agency SenaReider in 2012. SenaReider was relocated to San Antonio and spun off from Interlex in 2013. Heather Ruiz is SenaReider's CEO.

Literary career
Ruiz's first works were published in literary publications while he attended Harvard. His first book, ¡Adelante!, was published in 2003 by Random House. Ruiz also wrote an essay covering stereotypes and eating disorders called "Ghost of Gordolfo Gelatino," which was published in the book Going Hungry. In 2014, Ruiz authored Seven for the Revolution, a collection of short stories about the experiences of seven characters as they immigrate to the United States. The book was named as one of "The Top Ten Fiction Books by Latino Authors for 2014," and received four prizes at the 2014 International Latino Book Awards, along with another three awards at the Latino Books into Movies Awards including first place in the Action & Adventure category. Ruiz's fiction writing has also appeared in literary journals such as the Pushcart Prize-winning Ninth Letter. In 2017, Ruiz was awarded the Gulf Coast Prize for fiction.

During the Fall of 2018, the Notre Dame Review published Ruiz's short story, "Vexing Gifts." Reviewed as "vivid" and "palpable," the magical realism satire is highly critical of President Trump's border and immigration policies.

In December 2018 it was announced that Blackstone Publishing signed a multi-book contract with Ruiz. His first novel, titled The Resurrection of Fulgencio Ramirez, explores "not just the physical border between two countries, but borders between life and death … and past and present."

In 2019, New Texas, a Journal of Literature and Culture, published two of Ruiz's short stories, "Ports of Entry" and "The Limes." The stories are both installments in a border bildungsroman Ruiz is writing.

In 2020, Ruiz's short story, "The Limes," originally published in New Texas, was named a Finalist for the Texas Institute of Letters’ Kay Cattarulla Best Short Story Award. Also, his short story, "Oblivious," was selected – and published – as a Finalist for the Texas Observer Annual Short Story Award. In September 2020, his novel, The Resurrection of Fulgencio Ramirez, was released by Blackstone Publishing. The novel won two Gold Medals at the 2021 International Latino Book Awards.

In 2021, Ruiz’s short story, “Allegiance,” received Honorable Mention for the Dillydoun Review’s International Fiction Prize. It was subsequently published in the Dillydoun Review International Fiction Prize Anthology.

In 2022, Ruiz’s novel, Valley of Shadows, was released by Blackstone Publishing.

Advocacy
As an advocate, Ruiz has regularly contributed to CNN on issues such as comprehensive immigration reform, and tighter regulation and taxes on sugary drinks and unhealthy foods. He served on the board of directors of Center for Science in the Public Interest, a leading non-profit nutrition advocacy group based in Washington, D.C.

He was also the founding editor of RedBrownandBlue.com, a multicultural political commentary website.

Bibliography
¡ADELANTE!: una guía personal del éxito para usted y su familia (2003) – A guide for success for immigrants.
 Going Hungry: writers on desire, self-denial, and overcoming anorexia (2008) (Contributor) – A collection of essays about anorexia.
 Seven for the Revolution (2014) – A series of short stories that explore the lives of Latinos in America. Winner of Best Popular Fiction–English and Best First Book in Fiction at the 2014 International Latino Book Awards. Also won second place Most Inspirational Fiction Book and Honorable Mention Best Cover Design. According to Kirkus Reviews, the book contains "[w]ell-executed stories that offer fresh perspectives on long-standing societal problems."
 The Resurrection of Fulgencio Ramirez: A Novel (2020) – A novel, largely inspired by the stories of Ruiz's father, about a son of immigrants in a border town during the 1950s. The American Library Association's Booklist named it one of the Ten Best Debut Novels of 2020. In February 2021, it was longlisted for the Reading the West Book Awards. It was also named a Finalist for the 2021 Spur Award for Best Contemporary Novel by the Western Writers of America. The novel won two Gold Medals at the 2021 International Latino Book Awards: the Rudolfo Anaya Best Latino Focused Fiction Book and Best Audiobook.
 Valley of Shadows (2022) – A magical realism novel set in West Texas in the 1880s. It was released in September 2022 by Blackstone Publishing. ALA’s Booklist gave it a starred review and LitHub’s CrimeReads named it one of the Best Horror Novels of 2022.

External links
 Official site

References

American writers of Mexican descent
Living people
People from Brownsville, Texas
Year of birth missing (living people)
Writers from Texas
American male writers
21st-century American writers
Harvard Kennedy School alumni
Saint Joseph Academy (Brownsville, Texas) alumni
Writers from San Antonio
Magic realism writers